Ibn al-Khashshab may refer to:
Ibn al-Khashshab (died 1125), Shi'i qadi and ra'is of Aleppo during the rule of the Seljuk emir Ridwan
Ibn al-Khashshab (died 1134), qadi of Aleppo
Ibn al-Khashshab (lived 1160s), lived in Aleppo in the 1160s
Ibn Khashab Baghdadi (died c. 1171), wrote Taarikhe' Mawaleedul Aimmah wa Wafaatehim